Rotăria River may refer to:

 Rotăria River (Tazlăul Mare), a tributary of the Tazlăul Mare River in Romania
 Rotăria River (Râmnicul Sărat), a tributary of the Râmnicul Sărat River in Romania